The NOS Primavera Sound 2016 was held on 9 to 11 June 2016 at the Parque da Cidade, Porto, Portugal. The festival was headlined by Sigur Rós, PJ Harvey and Air.

Lineup
Headline performers are listed in boldface. Artists listed from latest to earliest set times.

NOS

{{hidden
| headercss = color:#ffffff; background: #1a76a0; font-size: 100%; width: 100%;;
| contentcss = text-align: left; font-size: 100%; width: 100%;;
| header = Sigur Rós set list
| content =

"Óveður"
"Starálfur"
"Sæglópur"
"Glósóli"
"Vaka"
"Ný batterí"
"E-Bow"
"Festival"
"Yfirborð"
"Kveikur"
"Hafsól"

Encore
"Popplagið"
}}

Super Bock

Pitchfork

Palco.

References

Primavera Sound
2016 music festivals
Music festivals in Portugal